For the Summer Olympics, there have been seven venues that have been or be used to host taekwondo.

References

 
Taek
Venues